The Madonna della tenda is an oil on panel painting by the Italian renaissance artist Raphael, created c. 1513–1514. It shows Mary embracing the child Christ, while the young John the Baptist watches. The design of the painting resembles that of the Madonna della seggiola from the same period.

See also
List of paintings by Raphael

Notes

References

External links

Paintings of the Madonna and Child by Raphael
Collection of the Alte Pinakothek
1514 paintings
Nude art
Paintings depicting John the Baptist